Lyuberetsky District is an administrative and municipal district (raion), one of the thirty-six in Moscow Oblast, Russia. It is located in the central part of the oblast east of the federal city of Moscow. Its administrative center is the city of Lyubertsy. Population: 265,113 (2010 Census);  The population of Lyubertsy accounts for 65.1% of the district's total population.

References

Notes

Sources

Districts of Moscow Oblast